Hassanali is an Indian Muslim name combining Hassan and Ali. As a surname, it can refer to:

 Khalid Hassanali, Trinidad and Tobago engineer and businessman
 Mustafa Hassanali (born 1980),Tanzanian fashion designer and doctor
 Noor Hassanali (1918–2006), former President of Trinidad and Tobago

Indian surnames
Surnames of Indian origin
Hindustani-language surnames
Urdu-language surnames